Timotej Dodlek (born 23 November 1989) is a Slovenian football midfielder.

Career
Dodlek started his senior career at Maribor, and played with the team between 2007 and 2014. In between he had loan spells with Slovenian sides Nafta Lendava, Šenčur and Mura 05.

In 2014 he left Maribor and moved to Hungary where he played with Dunaújváros in the 2014–15 Nemzeti Bajnokság I. Then, after a short spell back in Slovenia with Zavrč, he joined, on 28 February 2017, Lithuanian A Lyga side Utenis Utena. He then returned to the region of former Yugoslavia and played the first half of the 2017–18 season in Croatia with Hrvatski Dragovoljac, and the second half of the season in Serbia with Bačka Bačka Palanka, a newly promoted club of the Serbian SuperLiga.

Personal life
His younger brother, Sven Dodlek, is also a footballer.

Honours
Maribor
 Slovenian PrvaLiga: 2010–11, 2012–13, 2013–14
 Slovenian Cup: 2010, 2013
 Slovenian Supercup: 2013, 2014

References

External links
NZS profile 

1989 births
Living people
Sportspeople from Maribor
Slovenian footballers
Association football midfielders
NK Maribor players
NK Nafta Lendava players
ND Mura 05 players
Dunaújváros PASE players
NK Zavrč players
FK Utenis Utena players
NK Hrvatski Dragovoljac players
OFK Bačka players
FC Koper players
NK Aluminij players
Slovenian PrvaLiga players
Slovenian Second League players
Nemzeti Bajnokság I players
A Lyga players
First Football League (Croatia) players
Serbian SuperLiga players
Slovenian expatriate footballers
Slovenian expatriate sportspeople in Hungary
Expatriate footballers in Hungary
Slovenian expatriate sportspeople in Lithuania
Expatriate footballers in Lithuania
Slovenian expatriate sportspeople in Croatia
Expatriate footballers in Croatia
Slovenian expatriate sportspeople in Serbia
Expatriate footballers in Serbia
Slovenia youth international footballers